Manto is a 2017 Pakistani television biographical drama series, directed by Sarmad Khoosat who also played the titular role in the series, produced by Babar Javed and Asif Raza Mir under banner A&B Entertainment. The other cast includes Sania Saeed, Saba Qamar, Arjumand Rahim and Nimra Bucha in prominent roles.

Cast 
 Sarmad Khoosat as Saadat Hassan Manto
 Sania Saeed as Safia Manto
 Saba Qamar as Noor Jehan
 Arjumand Rahim as Bulwant Kaur
 Asad Siddiqui as Masood
 Akbar Subhani as Muhammad Hussain
 Mizna Waqas
 Qaiser Naqvi as Safia's mother
 Yasra Rizvi as Balwant Kaur
 Mahira Khan as Madari
 Sarmed Mirza as Shaukat Thanvi
 Azfar Rehman as Passenger

Production 

In 2012, it reported that Sarmad Khoosat is directing a TV series based on the life and literary work of Saadat Hassan Manto. It had a total of 20 episodes and was also made as the film. Both the film and the television series were directed by Khoosat, who also played the title character. Playwright Shahid Nadeem served as a screenwriter and Babar Javed produced the serial and film under A & B Entertainment at Geo Films. The series was scheduled to release in 2012, but was put on hold for the film production. In 2016, it revealed that Khoosat's film will be aired on television with the same cast. The series originally aired on Geo Entertainment from 3 November 2017.

Reception 
One review on Images described it as a thoughtful look at Manto and complimented several performances.

References 

2017 Pakistani television series debuts